The Mother Armenia ( Mayr Hayastan) monumental statue is a female personification of Armenia, located in the city of Gyumri. It resembles the monumental complex of Mother Armenia in the capital Yerevan. It was erected in 1975 on a hill west of Gyumri city. It was composed by sculptors Ara Sargsian, Gaspar Gasparyan and Yerem Vartanyan. The architect is Rafik Yeghoyan.

References

National personifications
Buildings and structures in Gyumri
Monuments and memorials in Armenia
Monuments and memorials built in the Soviet Union
Colossal statues
Sculptures in the Soviet Union
Armenian Soviet Socialist Republic
Tourist attractions in Gyumri
Statues in Armenia
Sculptures of women